The 1949 Kentucky Derby was the 75th running of the Kentucky Derby. The race took place on May 7, 1949, on a track rated fast.

Full results

 Winning breeder: Calumet Farm (KY)

References

1949
Kentucky Derby
Derby
Kentucky Derby